Bomarion is a genus of beetles in the family Cerambycidae, containing the following species:

 Bomarion achrostum Napp & Martins, 1982
 Bomarion affabile Napp & Martins, 1982
 Bomarion amborense Galileo & Martins, 2008
 Bomarion anormale (Thomson, 1867)
 Bomarion aureolatum Martins, 1968
 Bomarion boavidai Martins, 1968
 Bomarion carenatum Martins, 1962
 Bomarion fraternum Napp & Martins, 1982
 Bomarion heteroclitum (Thomson, 1867)
 Bomarion lineatum Gounelle, 1909
 Bomarion signatipenne Gounelle, 1909

References

Ectenessini